The Johannes-R.-Becher-Medaille was a civil decoration of East Germany created in homage to the poet and politician Johannes R. Becher. It was awarded by the Cultural Association of the GDR.

Description 
The medal is made of bronze, with a diameter of four centimetres. and shows on the obverse side a portrait of Johannes R. Becher surrounded by his name written in capital letters.

Award conditions 
It rewarded services "for the development of socialist culture in the GDR". It was awarded to individuals and communities from 1961 onwards for achievements in the fields of arts and culture, but also sports and recreation. The Johannes R. Becher Medal had three levels: bronze, silver and gold.

The award ceremony usually took place on 22 May, Johannes R. Becher's birthday.

Recipients 
 1961: Anna Seghers, Nathan Notowicz
 1962: Hans Pischner, Ehm Welk,  (Silver)
 1963: Walter Womacka
 1964: Gret Palucca (Gold), Dieter Noll
 1965:  (Gold)
 1966: Harry Hindemith (Gold), Herbert Sandberg
 1967: Richard Paulick (Gold), Herbert Ihering
 1968: Erich Arendt,   (Silver), Bernhard Seeger
 1969: Konrad Wolf (Gold), 
 1970: Barbara Dittus
 1971: Herbert Scurla
 1973: Annemarie Auer
 1975: , Marja Kubašec
 1978: Hanns Cibulka,  (Gold)
 1981: Inge Keller, Heinz Kahlau
 1985: Helmut Baierl
 
 Konstantin Fedin
 Hedwig Voegt

According to the German article, 171 people are recipients of this medal.

References

Further reading 
 .

Civil awards and decorations of Germany
Orders, decorations, and medals of East Germany
Awards established in 1961